August 2012 Mansehra Shia massacre refers to the massacre of 25 Shia Muslim residents of Gilgit-Baltistan travelling from Rawalpindi, Punjab to Gilgit, Gilgit Baltistan in Pakistan. The bus was stopped in Mansehra District and the people were killed after checking their identification cards which showed they were from the Shia community by individuals dressed in Military uniforms. Darra Adam Khel faction of Tehrik-i-Taliban Pakistan has claimed the responsibility for the attack.

Background

Religious extremism is prevalent in Pakistan. Members of the Shia community are targeted in a number of attacks against them in the country. There have been several Incidents of killing of Shia Muslims and bomb blasts in the Shia mosque in Pakistan.

The sectarian violence incidents happened after the radical Islamisation policies of former military dictator General Zia-ul-Haq. A systematic ethnic cleansing of Shia community is being carried out in Pakistan administered Kashmir.

Incident
Three buses were travelling from Rawalpindi, Punjab to Gilgit, Gilgit Baltistan. On a section of the Karakoram Highway (KKH), in Mansehra District (an area dominated by Sunni tribes), 10 to 12 gunmen in military uniform flagged the buses for stopping. After the bus halted, the gunmen climbed on board and asked passengers for identification. They checked the identity cards of all the passengers. After which the gunmen dragged a group of Shia men. They were then sprayed with bullets from AK-47 Assault rifle.

Response
United Nations The UN secretary general Ban Ki-moon termed the massacre as "appalling".

See also
 February 2012 Kohistan Shia massacre

References

Further reading
 Skardu Kargil road :Tear down the Berlin Wall of Asia – Engineer Manzoor Hussain Parwana
 

2012 murders in Pakistan
21st-century mass murder in Pakistan
Massacres in 2012
Mansehra District
Shia–Sunni relations
Violence against Shia Muslims in Pakistan
Terrorist incidents in Pakistan in 2012
Massacres in Pakistan
Massacres of men
Ethnic cleansing in Pakistan
History of Gilgit-Baltistan
Crime in Khyber Pakhtunkhwa
Violence against men in Asia
Terrorist incidents on buses in Asia